Oscar Bluemner (June 21, 1867 – January 12, 1938), born Friedrich Julius Oskar Blümner and after 1933 known as Oscar Florianus Bluemner, was a Prussian-born American Modernist painter.

Early life
Bluemner was born as Friedrich Julius Oskar Blümner in Prenzlau, Kingdom of Prussia (now Germany), on June 21, 1867. He studied painting and architecture at the Royal School of Art in Berlin.

Architecture
Bluemner moved to Chicago in 1893 where he freelanced as a draftsman at the World's Columbian Exposition. After the exposition, he attempted to find work in Chicago.  In 1901, he relocated to New York City where he also was unable to find steady employment. In 1903, he created the winning design for the Bronx Borough Courthouse in New York, although it is credited to Michael J. Garvin. The scandal that arose around this took down borough president Louis Haffen for corruption and fraud.

Painting

In 1908 Bluemner met Alfred Stieglitz, who introduced him to the artistic innovations of the European and American avant-garde.  By 1910, Bluemner had decided to pursue painting full-time rather than architecture.

He exhibited in the 1913 Armory Show. He said that the Americans' contribution failed to match that of the Europeans because the American selection process reflected rivalries and compromises rather than curatorial judgment, resulting in a "melée of antagonistic examples". Then in 1915 Stieglitz gave him a solo exhibition at his gallery, 291. Despite participating in several exhibitions, including solo shows, for the next ten years Bluemner failed to sell many paintings and lived with his family in near poverty.

He created paintings for the Federal Arts Project in the 1930s.

Later life
After his wife's death in 1926, Bluemner moved to South Braintree, Massachusetts. From there in 1932 he contributed a letter to an ongoing debate in the New York Times on the question "What is American Art?". He wrote:

He had a successful one-man show in 1935 at the Marie Harriman Gallery in New York City. In the New York Times, Edward Alden Jewell called it Bluemner's "apotheosis". He wrote:

Bluemner died by suicide on January 12, 1938.

Legacy
Stetson University holds more than 1,000 pieces of Oscar Bluemner's work bequeathed in 1997 by his daughter, Vera Bluemner Kouba. In 2009 the Homer and Dolly Hand Art Center at Stetson opened with a primary mission of housing a providing exhibition space for the Kouba Collection. Often overlooked in his lifetime, Bluemner now is widely acknowledged as a key player in the creation of American artistic Modernism, with better-known colleagues such as Georgia O'Keeffe and John Marin.
 
In 2013, the Montclair Art Museum in New Jersey presented an exhibition of Bluemner's works depicting the landscapes and industrial areas of Paterson, painted between 1910 and 1917, drawn from the Stetson holdings. It marked the centenary of the Paterson silk strike, which had inspired his politics.

An oil painting by Bluemner, Illusion of a Prairie, New Jersey (Red Farm at Pochuck) (1915) sold at Christie's, New York, for $5,346,500 on November 30, 2011.

Artworks

Notes

References

Further reading

 Exhibit catalog.
 Monograph about Bluemner.

External links
A finding aid to the Oscar Bluemner papers, 1886-1939, 1960, in Archives of American Art, Smithsonian Institution
Bluemner's Cat Florianus
Oscar Bluemner works. Held by the Department of Drawings & Archives, Avery Architectural & Fine Arts Library, Columbia University.

1867 births
1938 suicides
20th-century American painters
American male painters
Modern painters
American watercolorists
Artists from New York (state)
Public Works of Art Project artists
People from Braintree, Massachusetts
Painters who committed suicide
Suicides in Massachusetts
Artists from Massachusetts
1938 deaths
20th-century American male artists
Prussian emigrants to the United States